Elisabete Ribeiro Tavares Ansel (born 7 March 1980 in Palencia, Spain) is a Portuguese athlete specialising in the pole vault. Born to Portuguese parents of Cape Verdean descent, she has two younger sisters who also compete in the pole vault, Sandra-Helena Tavares and Maria Leonor Tavares.

She has personal bests of 4.35 metres outdoors (Albi 2008) and 4.40 metres indoors (Pombal 2008).

Competition record

References

1980 births
Living people
Portuguese female pole vaulters
Portuguese people of Cape Verdean descent